DISCERN Analytics, Inc. is a private, San Mateo-based SaaS company offering Insights-as-a-Service to investment professionals and business decision-makers. DISCERN Analytics, acquired selected assets of DISCERN Group, Inc in 2016.  The Insights-as-a-Service platform synthesizes relevant data from public and commercial data sources, and delivers synthesized data, alerts and personalized views to investment professionals and business decision-makers.

About
DISCERN is based in San Mateo, California.  The company offers business insights blended with contextual foresight to identify emerging trends and opportunity areas for allocation of capital. The firm employs information analytics tools and makes use of proprietary data streams to enable research about companies. It caters to institutional investors and business decision-makers.

History 
In 2008, The National Academy of Sciences Committee for Forecasting Future Disruptive Technologies invited Harry Blount to help conduct a research study on foresight using data, tech and processes. In 2009, based on the research, Harry formed a team to found the DISCERN, which began as a data-driven research provider. In 2012, the firm recruited additional engineers and started developing software product to help gather data in one browser-accessible location and see the data mapped to stock tickers. In 2014, the company rolled out a product for energy sector investors, operators and lenders. In May 2014, the company trademarked the phrase "Signals as a Service". The term refers to the notifications received by its subscribers, whose data is scanned persistently for business anomalies.  In 2016, the new company introduced products and services for real estate, consumer retail, energy and technology industries catering to investors, lenders and operators.

References

External links
 

Finance in the United States